The 30th Road is one of the major roads of Mandalay, Myanmar. It connect from east to west. Its east end is started from Circular Road and west end is in 86th street. The Mandalay Railway Station is built on the Road.

Major Junctions
Circular Road
62nd Road
73rd Road
78th Road

Remark Places 
Bahtoo Stadium
University of Medicine, Mandalay
Mingalar Market
Mandalay General Hospital
Mandalay Central Railway Station
Mandalay Region central High Court
Mandalay National High School
Mandalay Central Women Hospital

References 

Mandalay